Elkalyce diporides, the Chapman's cupid, is a small butterfly found in India that belongs to the lycaenids or blues family.

References
 
 
 
 
 
 

diporides
Butterflies of Asia
Taxa named by Thomas Algernon Chapman
Butterflies described in 1909